Dheke Dhekeves is a series of Maldivian comedy short films produced by Mohamed Abdulla. The short films are written and directed by different people and follow a linear storytelling though its final installment Dheke Dhekeves 6 has no continuation in the script from its prior installments.

List of productions

Plot

Part 1
Muhamma who is called a madman in the island, confesses his love for Pinky who shows no interest towards him. Pinky's friend, Reena returns to the island and is caught by Muhamma's attention. He buys her several gifts but she refuses to disclose her name even. Muhamma makes several efforts to accomplish his love but Reena mockingly declines, who at the time is planning her marriage with Fareed. Few days later, Reena realizes that Muhamma's feelings are true and accepts him as her love-interest.

Part 2
Muhamma rushes to airport to meet his love of life, Reena one last time but instead is smitten with the beauty of another young woman, Suzy, who was waiting at the departure terminal. Muhamma follows Suzy to her island and searches every house for her. There he runs into Pinky and changes his plan from pursuing Suzy's love to marrying Pinky. However, next morning he meets Suzy, and determines to win her heart through extreme measures. Rumors spread that Muhamma had multiple divorces and is a father of many children, which creates misunderstanding between Suzy and Muhamma. Further complication arises, when Pinky and Suzy discover that Muhamma is simultaneously dating both of them. Muhamma successfully convinced the duo of his equal affection and he marries both Pinky and Suzy. Soon after the marriage, it was revealed that Muhamma actually married a spirit (Fauziyya Hassan) in disguise of Pinky.

Part 3
The newly wedded couple, Muhamma and Suzy start experiencing paranormal activities. An expert suggests the couple to relocate to another island for a week where he encounters with Ninni, a young woman more attractive to Muhamma than Suzy. Few day later, Suzy discovers about Muhamma's affair and comes to a mutual understanding between the trio; after marriage, Muhamma shall spend first six months with Ninni and the rest of the year with Suzy. Muhamma's second wife, Faudy, a ghost, forewarns him that she will create disputes between his wives and everyone will abandon him. However, few hours later, he again falls for another woman, Sharumeela. As instructed by Faudy, Suzy ditches him and he ultimately gets bored of rest of his affairs.

Part 4
After Suzy's unexplained disappearance, Muhamma avoids all the women begging for his love including Ninni and Sharumeela. He hears the news of Suzy's marriage with another man and makes an emotional appearance in the ceremony. Concerned about his "non-affection towards women" condition, Muhamma consults a doctor  who gives a medicine as a cure. Soon after, Muhamma builds fondness towards women of every age, minor to elder. A stunning item-girl, Burnerz, the daughter of Faudy becomes the latest addition to Muhamma's list of romance. Faudy inquires from Muhamma about the murder of her husband and he explains it as an accidental death. Muhamma is mentally unstable and roam around the island calling out for his first love, Reena.

Part 5
Muhamma wears an amulet which repels women. One day, Muhamma meets Zamra in a forest and she proposes to him which Muhamma politely declines. Due to Zamra's consistent begging, Muhamma agrees to marry her despite his "zero-interest". After the marriage, the couple refrains from intimacy because Muhamma can not develop any emotional attachment. Meanwhile, Pinky returns to the same island on a mission to ruin Muhamma's wedding and win his heart back. Pinky removes his amulet and lures Muhamma into a trap where he shows more affection towards Pinky. Zamra successfully ties the amulet back on Muhamma's hand though the girls continue their fight to win Muhamma.

Part 6
Muhamma, an introvert and emotionally immature adult who is "allergic" to women is forced into a relationship with Nashaath  by his mother. Nashaath tries to seduce him into sex but Muhamma forcefully evades from her. Concerned of his phobia, Muhamma's mother consult him to an expert, Thakurufaanu whose medication turns him into a romeo. However, things do not go as planned when Muhamma becomes overly affectionate towards Nashaath after marriage. The black magic made by Thakurufaanu loses its power when the couple leaves abroad for honeymoon. Nashaath realizes that devoted version of Muhamma is not real but a curse and leaves him, while Muhamma celebrates being single.

Cast and characters

Soundtrack

Part 1

Part 2

Part 3

Part 4

Part 5

Part 6

References

Short film series
Maldivian short films